Cəfərli or Dzhafarly or Dzhafarli may refer to:
Cəfərli, Agsu, Azerbaijan
Cəfərli, Gadabay, Azerbaijan
Cəfərli, Imishli, Azerbaijan
Cəfərli, Jalilabad (disambiguation)
Cəfərli (39° 10' N 48° 26' E), Jalilabad, Azerbaijan
Cəfərli (39° 11' N 48° 13' E), Jalilabad, Azerbaijan
Cəfərli, Qazakh, Azerbaijan

ru:Джафарли